Catoptria biformellus is a species of moth in the family Crambidae described by Hans Rebel in 1893. It is found in Bulgaria and Transcaucasia.

The wingspan is 24–26 mm.

Subspecies
Catoptria biformellus biformellus
Catoptria biformellus klimeschi Ganev, 1983 (Bulgaria)

Catoptria majorellus is sometimes also treated as a subspecies of Catoptria biformellus.

References

Moths described in 1893
Crambini
Moths of Europe
Moths of Asia